Rashtriya Raksha Dal (National Defence Party), a political party in India, mainly based in Punjab. The party was founded on 7 August 1999, and works for the conditions of army veterans. The All India General Secretary of the party is Lt. Col. Adish Pal Singh Jhabal.

References

Political parties in Punjab, India
1999 establishments in Punjab, India
Political parties established in 1999